Western Peripheral Nahuatl is a group of Nahuatl languages of Western Mexico. They are:

Michoacán  Pómaro Nahuatl on the west coast
Coatepec and Temascaltepec Nahuatl of western México State and northwestern Guerrero
Colima–Durango: Mexicanero and extinct dialects of Colima

Pochutec may belong here.

References 

Nahuatl